"SoBeautiful" is the third single from Musiq Soulchild's fifth studio album, OnMyRadio. It was sent to US radio stations for airplay consideration in January 2009. It was nominated for a Grammy Award in the category of Best Male R&B Vocal Performance.

Background
In an interview with HitQuarters, producer and co-writer JR Hutson described the genesis of the song,
"We’d done a couple of other ideas just off the cuff ... and then as he was leaving I started playing those four chords that are in the beginning of the song. He put his bag down and began commenting on what I was playing. I then started building the track, and he started writing the song - a couple of hours later we had the basic skeleton to the record."

Charts

Weekly charts

Year-end charts

References

2009 singles
Musiq Soulchild songs
2008 songs
Songs written by Musiq Soulchild
Atlantic Records singles
Contemporary R&B ballads
Soul ballads